Leucoagaricus meleagris is a species of fungus in the family Agaricaceae.

Taxonomy 
Originally classified as Gymnopus meleagris by the British mycologist Samuel Frederick Gray in 1821 and reclassified as Leucoagaricus meleagris by the German mycologist Rolf Singer in 1951.

Description 
Leucoagaricus meleagris is a small dapperling mushrooms with white flesh in the cap and brown flesh in the stem.

Cap: 2-4cm. Starts conical before becoming convex with a large wide umbo. It is covered with fine scales. Stem: 7-8cm. May be club shaped and bulging in the middle with an annulus. Gills: Creamy white discolouring to yellowy brown with age. Freely attached to stipe. Spore print: White. Spores: Ellipsoid with a tiny pore. Smooth. Dextrinoid. 8-11 x 6-7.5 μm. Taste: Slightly farinaceous or floury. Smell: Indistinct.

Habitat and Distribution 
L. meleagris grows in small groups and tufts in the Autumn. It is reported as being widespread but rarely recorded in the United Kingdom. Observations of it appear to be uncommon in Europe with the most common locations for purported observations being the East Coast of the United States.

References 

meleagris
Taxa described in 1821
Taxa named by Samuel Frederick Gray